Keystone Building is a historic commercial building located at Harrisburg, Dauphin County, Pennsylvania.  It was built in 1875 as the State Printing Office.  It is a six-story office building, plus basement, 7 bays wide and 12 bays deep. It is faced in granite on the first floor, with brick above. It was remodeled in 1917, with the addition of a structural steel frame and 12-inch reinforced floors.

It was added to the National Register of Historic Places in 1979.

This building is not to be confused with the Commonwealth Keystone Building, a nearby State Government office building completed in 2000.

References

Buildings and structures in Harrisburg, Pennsylvania
Commercial buildings on the National Register of Historic Places in Pennsylvania
Commercial buildings completed in 1875
National Register of Historic Places in Harrisburg, Pennsylvania